The Mezzotint is a supernatural television drama produced by the BBC. Running at 30 minutes, it was based on the ghost story The Mezzotint by British writer and academic M. R. James, included in his 1904 collection Ghost Stories of an Antiquary. Adapted and directed by Mark Gatiss, it was broadcast on 24 December 2021 on BBC Two as part of the long-running A Ghost Story for Christmas series.

Synopsis
In 1922 the middle-aged and bumptious bachelor Edward Williams (Rory Kinnear) is living an uncomplicated life as the curator of a small museum at an Oxford-style college. His life revolves around his work, golf, playing cards and trying to solve a family mystery - why his great grandfather had two surnames on his birth certificate. Specialising in the topography of England, he is initially disinterested when an art dealer sends him details of an early 19th-century engraving, a mezzotint, of an old country house. The engraving has a very high price - two guineas - for so average a piece - and Williams sends for it on approval to see if it justifies the amount being asked for. When the picture arrives his golfing friend Binks (John Hopkins) comments on the wonderful play of moonlight across the lawn in the picture. And a figure on the edge of the engraving. But there hadn’t been a moon - or a figure - when Williams had first looked at it. Williams encounters the eccentric Mrs Ambrigail (Frances Barber), the wife of the local vicar, and discusses with her his attempts at solving the mystery about his ancestor's two surnames. 

Binks discovers that the house in the picture is Anningley Hall in Essex, where the infant child of a former owner disappeared mysteriously one night, soon after the child’s father had Gawdy, a local poacher, executed. The heartbroken father, who was discovered dead three years later, turns out to be the artist who created the mezzotint. Williams discovers that the mezzotint changes every time he looks at it - with something sinister and “rather too grotesque” appearing in the image with links to his own family.

Cast
Rory Kinnear .. Williams
Robert Bathurst .. Garwood
Frances Barber .. Mrs. Ambrigail
John Hopkins .. Binks
Emma Cunniffe .. Mrs. Filcher
Nikesh Patel .. Nisbet
Tommaso Di Vincenzo .. Gawdy

Adaptation
The drama was made by Can Do Productions and Adorable Media for BBC Television and was broadcast on Christmas Eve 2021. Filming was completed in February 2021 on a small budget and with limited shooting time.

As with most adaptations in the series, additional material was created which diverged from the story.  A subplot was added tying Mr. Williams’s family to the events depicted in the mezzotint, leading to the appearance of a gory apparition. The adaptation also added female characters, with a subplot involving a debate over whether or not the college should grant degrees to women, and the character of Nesbit was portrayed as being of South Asian descent. The acrobat and contortionist Tommaso Di Vincenzo, whose skills had previously been used in Gatiss's Dracula (2020), appears in the final scene.

In an interview with RadioTimes.com, Mark Gatiss said of his adaptation:
"You know, I think what you usually end up doing with an adaptation, say, of an M.R. James story, is trying to preserve the stuff that works best as dialogue, and isn’t too chewy, but still has a wonderful period flavour, and then expanding the parts which need expanding.

And also, it’s a different form. You’ve got to feel like you could adapt it, and invent, and make it suit film or television in that way. Otherwise, it’s just a sort of static retelling of it."

Benji Wilson, the critic of The Daily Telegraph, gave the production four stars out of five and wrote:
"...there was some genuine horror to be had, as the Thing from the picture turned in to the Thing on our screen and it was a lot more disturbing than anything Doctor Who has come up with this year.

Usually the power to shock resides in jump starts, or in explicit imagery or busted taboos. Here, you knew what was coming - the
picture had told you - but the climax still had me jumping out of my seat."

Also giving the drama four stars out of five, Lucy Mangan, the critic for The Guardian wrote:
"The Mezzotint (BBC Two), an M. R. James short story adapted by aficionado Mark Gatiss into a glittering half-hour nugget, is an absolute treat. These two masters of their forms can nudge even the most committed sceptic into willingly suspending their disbelief for a tight 30 minutes, especially when the plot runs like clockwork and is as stuffed with actors as a stocking is with gifts."

Locations

The Mezzotint was filmed in early 2021 in Southern England, mostly in Harrow, London. "We were very blessed with Harrow, because it was like a studio," the writer and director Mark Gatiss said in an interview with Radio Times. "I mean, everything was within about a quarter of a mile, even the golf course. That’s the sort of creative thinking that is very useful."

The golf course was Harrow School Golf Course in Harrow on the Hill, London. The museum Williams cycles to at the beginning of the drama was filmed at the Chapel at Harrow School. Williams’s home was filmed at Deynecourt on Harrow Park, Harrow on the Hill, while the church visited by Williams where he encounters Mrs Ambrigail and discusses tracing his ancestors was filmed at St. Mary's church on Church Hill in Harrow on the Hill.

References

External links

Adaptations of works by M. R. James
BBC television dramas
Television shows based on short fiction
A Ghost Story for Christmas
2021 television films